Confederated sejm was a form of sejm in the Polish–Lithuanian Commonwealth in the 18th century.  After 1764, sejms were frequently confederated.  Under rules of confederation, decisions were made by the majority of deputy votes cast, and so the privilege of liberum veto did not apply.

Examples of confederated Sejms: Repnin Sejm, Great Sejm.

See also
 Confederation
 Sejmik
 Liberum veto
 Constitution of May 3, 1791

Polish confederations
Sejm of the Polish–Lithuanian Commonwealth